This is a list of officials during the Helvetic Republic. During its short existence (1798–1803), the institutions of the Helvetic Republic changed frequently.

Executive

Directory (directoire) (1798 – 7 January 1800)

Members of the Directory

Presidents of the Directory

Landammann of the Helvetic Republic, 21 November 1801 
 Alois von Reding, First Landammann
 Johann Rudolf von Frisching, Second Landammann

Ministers of the First Helvetic Republic 
 Franz Bernhard Meyer von Schauensee, Exterior
 Hans Konrad Finsler, Finance and Economy
 Albrecht Rengger, Interior
 Philipp Albert Stapfer, Arts and Science, later ambassador in Paris
 Hans Caspar Hirzel, Justice and Police
 Joseph Lanther, War

Legislature

Senate 

Senators as of .. (names normalized where possible)

References

Lists of office-holders in Switzerland
Helvetic Republic
Switzerland history-related lists